Ceratothoa is a genus of isopod ectoparasites of teleost fish, first described by James Dwight Dana in 1852. Infection by Ceratothoa can cause anaemia, lesions, growth retardation, emaciation, and mortality in their fish hosts.

Species
Currently, 26 valid species in this genus are recognized:

C. carinata and C. oxyrrhynchaena were redescribed in 2013, and C. angulata, C. capri, C. carinata, C. collaris, C. gilberti, C. gobii, C. guttata, C. italica, C. oestroides, and C. verrucosa in 2016.

A number of taxa are species inquirendae:
 Ceratothoa contracta (Miers, 1880)
 Ceratothoa deplanata Bovallius, 1885
 Ceratothoa gaudichaudii (H. Milne Edwards, 1840) (previously known as Ceratothoa rapax Heller, 1865)
 Ceratothoa novaezelandiae Filhol, 1885
 Ceratothoa transversa (Richardson, 1901)
 Ceratothoa triglae Gourret, 1891

References

Cymothoida
Isopod genera
Parasitic crustaceans
Taxa named by James Dwight Dana